David Ronald de Mey Warren  (20 March 192519 July 2010) was an Australian scientist, best known for inventing and developing the flight data recorder and cockpit voice recorder (also known as FDR, CVR and "the black box").

Early life
Warren was born to Rev Hubert and Ellie Warren and had three siblings. He was born on a remote mission station on Groote Eylandt in the Northern Territory, the first white child born on the island. He was educated at Launceston Church Grammar School and Trinity Grammar School, New South Wales. His father died in the crash of the de Havilland D.H.86 Miss Hobart over the Bass Strait in 1934.

He earned a Bachelor of Science degree with Honours from the University of Sydney, a PhD in fuels and energy from Imperial College London, a Diploma of Imperial College, and a Diploma of Education from the University of Melbourne.

Career

Summary
1944–46 – Teacher of mathematics and chemistry, Geelong Grammar School, Victoria.
1947–48 – Lecturer in chemistry, University of Sydney. 
1948–51 – Scientific Officer, Woomera Rocket Range and Imperial College, London. 
1952–83 – Principal Research Scientist, Aeronautical Research Laboratories, Melbourne, (now part of the Defence Science and Technology Organisation). 
1981–82 – Scientific Adviser (Energy) to the Victorian State Parliament.

Warren worked at what are now the Defence Science and Technology Organisation's Aeronautical Research Laboratories in Melbourne from 1952 to 1983, rising to the level of principal research scientist. While there, he came up with the idea for the cockpit voice recorder while investigating a crash of the world's first commercial jet airliner, the Comet, in 1953, after seeing a miniature voice recorder at a trade show. "If a businessman had been using one of these in the plane and we could find it in the wreckage and we played it back, we'd say, 'We know what caused this.'", Warren later recalled. "Any sounds that were relevant to what was going on would be recorded and you could take them from the wreckage." 

While devices had been previously used to record certain flight parameters, they did not include voice recording, and were not reusable, and therefore were not practical for routine commercial flights. Warren's invention, which relied on magnetic recording media, allowed easy erasing and re-recording, which made it practical for routine line service. Warren's concept of cockpit voice recording added a new dimension to instrument data in flight recorders, and has proved extremely valuable for accident investigation. Some accidents where the CVR played a prominent role were solved not by the crew's recorded voices, but by other sounds incidentally recorded on the CVR, which provided a vital clue to the accident cause.

Committees, honours, awards and recognition
Warren was the chair of the Combustion Institute (Aust & NZ Section) for 25 years (1958–83), the founding chair of the Morris Minor Car Club of Victoria (1977-2002), as well as committee member of the Chemical Society, the Institute of Fuel, and the Australian Institute of Energy. 

Warren received many awards and honours, including The Australian Institute of Energy Medal (1999), the Hartnett Medal of the Royal Society of the Arts (2000), the Centenary Medal (2001), the Lawrence Hargrave Award of the Royal Aeronautical Society (2001), Officer of the Order of Australia (AO) (2002), and the ICAO Edward Warner Award (2016).

Recognition 
In November 2008, Qantas named one of their Airbus A380s after Warren in honour of his services to aviation.

Warren died on 19 July 2010, aged 85, in Melbourne. He was buried in a casket bearing the label "Flight Recorder Inventor; Do Not Open" (a play off of the "FLIGHT RECORDER DO NOT OPEN" label on his recorders).

In June 2012, the ACT Government named a road, David Warren Road, in the suburb of Hume.

David Warren was inducted into the Australian Aviation Hall of Fame on 16 November 2013.

On 25 March 2014, the Defence Science and Technology Organisation renamed their Canberra headquarters the "David Warren Building".

On 20 March 2021, Google showed a Doodle on its home page in some countries for David Warren's 96th birthday.

Notes and references

External links
Biography at Defence Science and Technology Organisation 
This little-known inventor has probably saved your life. BBC News, 18 July 2019

1925 births
2010 deaths
People educated at Launceston Church Grammar School
Australian scientists
20th-century Australian inventors
University of Sydney alumni
Alumni of Imperial College London
Officers of the Order of Australia
Recipients of the Centenary Medal
Defence Science and Technology Organisation
Articles containing video clips